Hermann Lemperle (22 May 1906 – 19 September 1983) was a German athlete. He competed in the men's decathlon at the 1928 Summer Olympics.

References

External links
 

1906 births
1983 deaths
Athletes (track and field) at the 1928 Summer Olympics
German decathletes
Olympic athletes of Germany
People from Biberach an der Riss
Sportspeople from Tübingen (region)